Sea Containers House is a prominent building on the south bank of the River Thames, west of Blackfriars Bridge, in London.

Location 
Sea Containers House is located towards the eastern end of London's South Bank cultural area, and is within the London Borough of Southwark. A continuous river-side walkway, actually part of the Thames Path, passes in front of and below the building, and links it with near river-side attractions such as the Festival Hall, the National Theatre, the Tate Modern, the Oxo Tower and the Globe Theatre.

History

Sea Containers House was designed by noted American Modernist architect Warren Platner in 1974 as a luxury hotel. During construction, however, its location near the City of London led to the decision to complete it instead as office space. It opened in 1978 and took its name from the former long-term tenant, Sea Containers.

In Spring 2011, a process began to gain planning permission for an extensive internal and external refurbishment of Sea Containers House. The east and west wings, which face the Thames, remained offices, with companies within global communications group WPP moving in February 2016. The south wing was renovated as the Mondrian Hotel London, which opened on 30 September 2014, bringing at least part of the building back to its original intended use. The hotel became independent and was renamed Sea Containers London Hotel on 15 January 2019.

Cultural influence
In October 2009, three-piece music band Gyratory System released the album The Sound-Board Breathes with a track named Sea Containers House.

Notes

External links

Sea Containers House refurbishment consultation website

Office buildings in the London Borough of Southwark
Hotels in the London Borough of Southwark
Office buildings completed in 1978